Madrona is a village in the municipality of Segovia, in the province of Segovia, in the autonomous community of Castile and León, Spain. In 2020 it had 423 inhabitants.

Demography

References 
Towns in Spain
Populated places in the Province of Segovia